Skarszyn may refer to the following places in Poland:
Skarszyn, Lower Silesian Voivodeship (south-west Poland)
Skarszyn, Masovian Voivodeship (east-central Poland)